Henry Nicholls may refer to:

 H. R. Nicholls Society, a right-wing Australian think tank on industrial relations
 Henry Nicholls, explorer and member of the African Association
 Henry Nicholls (cricketer) (born 1991),  New Zealand cricketer
 Henry Nicholls (politician) (1893–1962), British politician, MP for Stratford West Ham, 1945–1950
 Henry George Nicholls (1825–1867), English Anglican priest and writer
 Henry George Nicholls (pastor) (c. 1852–1936), Congregational minister in England and South Australia and Presbyterian minister in Victoria, Australia

See also
Harry Nicholls (1915–1975), English recipient of the VC
Henry Nichols (disambiguation)

Nicholls, Henry